Collateral ligament of ankle joint may refer to:

 Deltoid ligament
 Lateral collateral ligament of ankle joint